Clark's Conveniency is a historic home located near Pomona, Kent County, Maryland, United States. It is a -story, early-18th-century brick house built in three sections: the main block and a wing on the east and west ends. It is representative of the houses built by the smaller but still prosperous planters of 18th-century tidewater Maryland.

Clark's Conveniency was listed on the National Register of Historic Places in 1975.

References

External links
, including photo from 1973 at Maryland Historical Trust

Houses in Kent County, Maryland
Houses on the National Register of Historic Places in Maryland
National Register of Historic Places in Kent County, Maryland